"Moustache" is a song by French trio Twin Twin. It was chosen to represent France at the Eurovision Song Contest 2014 in Denmark. It finished last in the final with 2 points. It was the first non-English language song to place last in the final since 2000.

Music video

A music video for the song was released on 17 March 2014. It features the group as contestants on a game show, with lead singer Lorent desperately wanting to win a moustache in the competition. The video was directed by Guillaume Coulpier of Extermitent Production.

Charts

See also
 France in the Eurovision Song Contest 2014

References

Eurovision songs of France
Eurovision songs of 2014
Articles containing video clips